The Absence of Presence is the sixteenth studio album by American progressive rock band Kansas. The album was originally due to be released on June 26, 2020, but due to manufacturing delays the release date was postponed to July 17, 2020. It is their fourth studio album without founding member, lead vocalist and keyboardist Steve Walsh, who retired from the band in 2014; the other three being 1982's Vinyl Confessions, 1983's Drastic Measures and 2016's The Prelude Implicit. It is their second album with lead vocalist and keyboardist Ronnie Platt and guitarist Zak Rizvi. It is their final album with Rizvi. It is the first album with keyboardist Tom Brislin, who replaced former keyboardist David Manion.

Background 
The Absence of Presence serves as a follow-up to The Prelude Implicit, but unlike that album, The Absence of Presence was written entirely by the band. The bulk of the songwriting duties were carried out by the band's newest members, Zak Rizvi (who wrote the music for 6 of the 9 songs) and Tom Brislin (who wrote the music for the other 3 songs, plus lyrics for 6 songs), with other lyric contributions by Ronnie Platt (2 songs) and founding member Phil Ehart (4 songs). Ehart also came up with the album title, as well as at least three of the song titles (the title track, "Throwing Mountains", and "Animals on the Roof"), which gave Brislin a concept to work with. The Absence of Presence marks the debut lead vocal from Brislin, making the total number of lead vocalists in the band at three, a feature not seen since Somewhere to Elsewhere. The album's recording sessions took place simultaneously with the band's tour cycle.

Track listing

Personnel
Ronnie Platt – lead vocals 
Rich Williams – electric and acoustic guitars, co-producer
Zak Rizvi – electric guitar, backing vocals, production and mixing
Tom Brislin – keyboards, backing vocals, lead vocals on "The Song The River Sang"
David Ragsdale – violin, backing vocals
Billy Greer – bass and backing vocals
Phil Ehart – drums, percussion, co-producer

Charts

References

Kansas (band) albums
2020 albums
Inside Out Music albums